Sergey Vodyanovich (born 2 May 1995) is a Belarusian professional footballer who is currently playing for Volna Pinsk.

Honours
Dinamo Brest
Belarusian Cup winner: 2016–17

References

External links

Profile at Belshina website

1995 births
Living people
Belarusian footballers
Association football midfielders
FC Belshina Bobruisk players
FC Dynamo Brest players
FC Volna Pinsk players